Novinka is a rural locality (a selo) in Alyoshnikovskoye Rural Settlement, Zhirnovsky District, Volgograd Oblast, Russia. The population was 462 as of 2010. There are 7 streets.

Geography 
Novinka is located in forest steppe of Volga Upland, 54 km northeast of Zhirnovsk (the district's administrative centre) by road. Pogranichnoye is the nearest rural locality.

References 

Rural localities in Zhirnovsky District